Engabao or Puerto Engabao is a small beach town in Playas, Guayas, in southern Ecuador. It is 16.6 km from Playas Villamil.

Engabao is a popular surfing destination and also has a lot of fishing activity.

References

External links 
 https://www.facebook.com/PuertoEngabaoEcuador/

Guayas Province